New Hampshire's 7th State Senate district is one of 24 districts in the New Hampshire Senate. It has  been represented by Republican Daniel Innis since 2022.

Geography
District 7 covers parts of Belknap and Merrimack Counties in the center of the state. The district includes the towns of Andover, Belmont, Boscawen, Canterbury, Franklin, Gilford, Laconia, Northfield, Salisbury, and Webster.

The district is split evenly between New Hampshire's 1st congressional district and New Hampshire's 2nd congressional district.

Recent election results

2022

Elections prior to 2022 were held under different district lines.

Historical election results

2020

2018

2016

2014

2012

Federal and statewide results in District 7

References

7
Belknap County, New Hampshire
Merrimack County, New Hampshire